Mein Name sei Gantenbein (roughly "[Let] my name be Gantenbein") is a 1964 novel by the Swiss writer Max Frisch. It was translated into English in 1965 by Michael Bullock as A Wilderness of Mirrors; this translation was later reprinted under the title Gantenbein in 1982. The novel features a narrator who recounts a multitude of dislocated, fragmented stories, which together reveal certain traits and patterns.

Themes
Literature professor Michael Butler, in his essay "Identity and authenticity in postwar Swiss and Austrian novels", wrote that Gantenbein marks a different direction in Frisch's writing, as it "possesses a postmodern playfulness" instead of "the serious irony of its predecessors". Butler wrote: "Scepticism towards the traditional claim of language to structure the world is now seen not as a threat to identity but as liberating the ego from premature restriction. The very creativity involved in constructing stories that can be on 'like clothes' is itself perceived as evidence of an authentic connection with life. ... What appeared to begin as a postmodern exercise in narrative irony turns into the acknowledgement that happiness can only be won within the confines of empirical reality."

Writing process
In a 1964 self-reflective text, Frisch explained his approach to narrative structure in Gantenbein. He wrote that the aim was "to show the reality of an individual by having him appear as a blank patch outlined by the sum of fictional entities congruent with his personality. ... The story is not told as if an individual could be identified by his factual behaviour; let him betray himself in his fictions."

See also
 1964 in literature
 Swiss literature

References

1964 novels
German-language novels
Novels by Max Frisch
Swiss speculative fiction novels
Suhrkamp Verlag books